The Kentucky Cup Juvenile Stakes is an American Thoroughbred horse race run annually in late September as part of Kentucky Cup Day at Turfway Park in the Cincinnati, Ohio suburb of Florence, Kentucky.

A  miles (8.5 furlongs) Grade III race for two-year-old colts, it was raced on natural dirt until 2005 when Turfway Park installed the new synthetic Polytrack surface. For 2009, the race was downgraded from a Grade III event to ungraded status and, along with its counterpart for filles, the Kentucky Cup Juvenile Fillies Stakes, was then discontinued due to financial restraints. The event offered a purse of $100,000 in 2008.

Inaugurated in 1989 as the In Memoriam Stakes, the Kentucky Cup Juvenile Stakes was also run as the Alysheba Stakes from 1989 to 1993.

With the support of WinStar Farm, this race which was suspended in 2009 and 2010 due to economic challenges, will return in 2011.  The Juvenile has lost its grade III ranking because it was not run for two consecutive years (2009–10).

Records
Time record
 1:42.89 - Boston Harbor (1996)

Most wins by an owner
 2 - Overbrook Farm (1995, 1996) and Padua Stables (1999, 2002)

Most wins by a jockey
 3 - Mike E. Smith (1997, 2002, 2006)

Most wins by a trainer
 3 - D. Wayne Lukas (1995, 1996, 1999)

Winners since 1991

References

 Kentucky Cup Juvenile Stakes at Pedigree Query
 Official website for Turfway Park
 Kentucky Cup Stakes restored by WinStar Farm

Turfway Park horse races
Flat horse races for two-year-olds
Previously graded stakes races in the United States
Recurring sporting events established in 1989
1989 establishments in Kentucky